HNLMS Johan de Witt is the second Landing Platform Dock (LPD) amphibious warfare ship of the Royal Netherlands Navy. The ship, displacing 16,800 tons, was launched on 13 May 2006. The motto of the ship is Ago Quod Ago, translated as I do what I do.

Design

Equipment

The ship is equipped with a large helicopter deck for helicopter operations and a dock for large landing craft. It can carry six NH 90 helicopters or four Chinook helicopters. It has a well dock for two landing craft utility and it carries four davit-launched LCVPs. The dock is wide enough to support two LCAC, but to allow for this, the centre barrier, that splits the dockwell in two, must be removed.

The vessel has an extra deck with rooms for command staff to support a battalion size operation. The ship has a complete Role II hospital, including an operating theatre and intensive care facilities. A surgical team can be stationed on board. The ship also has a desalination system enabling it to convert seawater into drinking water.

It is equipped with pod propulsion enabling the ship to use dynamic positioning while sea basing.

Sensors and armament

The sensor suite consists of a Thales Netherlands Variant 2D Air and Surface surveillance radar, the Thales Scout Low Probability of Intercept Surface surveillance and tactical navigation radar and the Thales GateKeeper Electro-Optical warning system.

When participating in high-risk operations Johan de Witt needs additional protection from frigates or destroyers. For protection against incoming anti-ship missiles or hostile aircraft and swarm attacks the ship has two Goalkeeper CIWS systems  and 4-6 manual operated .50 Browning or FN Mag machine guns

Operational history
Johan de Witts home port is in Den Helder. The ship has participated twice (2010 and 2013) in anti-piracy operations off the coast of Somalia, where it successfully disrupted pirate activities and patrolled the coast with the landing craft functioning as forward operating bases. Johan de Witt also supported the locals with medical assistance and supplying food and water.

In October 2015 the ship participated in the NATO exercise Trident Juncture held close to Spain. In 2016 Johan de Witt took part in a joint Dutch-British exercise called Cold Response. Later that year she would participate in a joint German-Finnish-Swedish-Dutch exercise called BALTOPS. After this exercise she returned to the Netherlands  for maintenance that would last a year. In the autumn of 2018 the ship would participate in the NATO exercise Trident Juncture.

The ships loaded supplies like food, water and medicines at the island of Sint Maarten before continuing to the Bahamas.

See also
 
 
 HNLMS Rotterdam (L800)

References

External links

 Johan de Witt at defensie.nl

Rotterdam-class landing platform docks
Amphibious warfare vessels of the Royal Netherlands Navy
2006 ships